Sunny Side Up (previously known as The Sunny Side Up Show) is  a defunct television programming block which premiered on Sprout on September 26, 2007 and ended on August 11, 2017. Each week, a new theme was introduced, including food, Halloween, animals, construction, fall, opposites, and birthdays. Sunny Side Up aired at 9:00 AM Eastern/8:00 AM Central until 12:00 PM Eastern/11:00 AM Central each weekday morning. The hosts of Sunny Side Up played games, sang songs, told stories, and showed birthday cards or artwork.

Sunny Side Up was Sprout's morning program. It was produced live every weekday, and hosted by a human host along with Chica, a chicken puppet who later got her own show. Before moving to a "city apartment" set, the show took place on a set dubbed The Sunshine Barn and decorated with farm-themed objects. The hosts were Carly and Tim. Each hosted the show for one week with each week's host being announced late in the previous week. Each week's host introduced programs, read birthdays, led activities related to the week's theme, and read messages sent in by individual "Sproutlet" viewers through the Sprout website. There were daily activities such as "The Good Egg Awards" (renamed "The Kindness Kid Awards") celebrating viewers' accomplishments, and "Sproutlet Stories" allowed "Sproutlets" to tell different stories with different plots, characters, and settings.

The theme tune from 2007 to 2013 was Brand New Day, but from 2013 to 2017 it was Chica's Here.

Some episodes of the show were supposedly archived by IMDb and on-demand services since Sprout rebranded, and few can even be found on YouTube.

Origins and history 
Andrew Beecham, Sprout's senior vice president of programming, knew he wanted a live show, so executives agreed that a live show with guest appearances from Sprout characters, viewer submissions, and weekly themes would be perfect for Sprout. The block first premiered on September 26, 2007, two years exact after the Sprout channel launched with Kelly Vrooman and Kevin Yamada alongside Chica the puppet chicken as the first hosts, Sean Roach joined the founding trio of presenters the following year.

On September 25, 2010, to celebrate the launch of the Sprout original series Noodle and Doodle, the block expanded to include Saturday and Sunday weekend morning broadcasts instead of just taking the weekend off and handing over to The Let’s Go Show, another Sprout programming block at the time. It was around the time that the set was remodeled, now featuring a green flower-shaped clock and a red and blue crate.

For several years, The Sunny Side Up Show was taped at the Comcast Center in Philadelphia, Pennsylvania before moving to 30 Rockefeller Plaza in New York City in 2014, as Sprout was acquired by NBCUniversal the previous year, in a studio not too far from The Roots' wardrobe rack. Since the move to New York, Sprout started snagging celebrity guest stars to appear on the program after they appeared on The Today Show.

Segments

2007–2015
The block starts with the host and Chica greeting the viewers, and explaining the date and weather, and the day's theme.

The next segment involves birthday cards and wishes. Mr. Mailman, a mailman puppet, would send the cards to the Sunshine Barn.

The next segment involves a different song or dance each day.

The next segment involves the hosts making a craft or cooking a recipe. Based on the app "Dress Chica", during a show that comes on at 10:00 am, the hosts would demonstrate the viewers’ idea of Chica's disguise. Dress Chica was created since executives wanted a game and segment that would help kids get dressed. A Dress Chica app was released by New Wave Entertainment in 2009, alongside "Sprout Player" and "Dress Like Chica."

The "Good Egg Awards" Are Around From (September 15, 2009,-May 13, 2015) and the hosts would read different awards given to viewers online.

Next, the hosts would do a dance titled the Barnyard Boogie. In 2013, the segment was replaced with a new segment titled Sproutlet Stories, where viewers online could make up three different stories: a pirate adventure, a royal adventure, and a space adventure.

Also, in 2014, a new penultimate segment was added, titled Chica's Choice, where a five-inch spinning wheel would be spun to direct everyone to do something fun.

The next segment involves sharing the remainder birthday cards and wishes.

From (June 13,2011-April 24, 2015) the hosts would host the Sproutlet News Report, where viewers could share what they did and how they showed care for each other, with amazing voicemails. & The hosts would close the block by telling viewers to stay tuned for the Sprout Sharing Show and The Good Night Show.

2015–2017
In September 2015, as part of Sprout's new design, the setting was changed to a city apartment.

The birthday cards and wishes were still going, as well as crafts. Temporarily, the Dress Chica, Chica's Choice, Sproutlet Stories and Sproutlet News Report were removed from the block. In 2017, Chica was removed to make way for the Sprout House block.

Cast

Hosts 
 Carly Ciarrocchi hosted the show from June 4, 2012, replacing Liz, to August 11, 2017, when she became the host of Sprout House (the show's spiritual successor).
 Tim Kubart hosted the show from December 30, 2013, as one of the winners of the Host Hunt contest, to August 11, 2017. Kubart is also a kindie artist and plays the tambourine for Postmodern Jukebox.
Chica was a chicken puppet who co-hosted Sunny Side Up with Emily, Carly, Tim, and Kaitlin. Before moving to a city apartment, she lived in The Sunshine Barn. She had a voice which resembled a squeaker. Her character had been part of the show from 2007 to 2017. She also made occasional appearances on both The Sprout Sharing Show and its successor Sprout Control Room. Executives wanted the puppet co-host to be a chicken, though Beecham thought preschoolers couldn't connect well with chickens, and worked with a designer to make sure the puppet was cute enough. One of the reasons for Chica's squeaking was because her puppeteers ("Chicateers") were all associate producers who would help out in the control room on the third of a three-week cycle. Over the years, Chica has been played by the likes of Forrest Harding, Brendan Gawel (who also played Curtis E. Owl on The Sprout Sharing Show), Edward Pokropski, Jenn Santee, Jackie Payton, Scott McClennen, Kimberly Diaz, and Matt Fornwald.
 Kevin Yamada hosted The Show from September 26, 2007, having previously hosted The Birthday Show, to December 25, 2009, announcing he was moving to the big city, and was replaced by Dennisha. Yamada also played Ricky Rabbit on The Sprout Sharing Show.
 Liz Filios hosted the show from November 1st, 2010 to June 4th, 2012, when she was replaced by Carly.
 Sean Roach hosted the show from early 2008 to December 13, 2013, focusing more on his arts. Roach also hosted Noodle and Doodle, Sprout's first full-length original series.
 One of the first two hosts (alongside Kevin), Kelly Vrooman hosted the show from September 26th, 2007 to December 20th, 2013, hosting the Kindest Kid special on the next two days. Vrooman also played Patty Pig on The Sprout Sharing Show and Kelly on The Chica Show.
 Dennisha Pratt hosted the show from December 31st, 2009, replacing Kevin, to June 13th, 2014, when she and her family moved away. She was replaced by Emily.
 Kaitlin Becker hosted the show from January 6th, 2014, as one of the winners of the Host Hunt contest, to May 19th, 2017. Becker also plays Meekah in the Blippi franchise.
 Emily Borromeo hosted the show from May 23rd, 2014, replacing Dennisha, to June 29th, 2017.

Recurring characters 

 Mr. Mailman was a cartoon character who used to appear on The Birthday Show and on The Sunny Side Up Show during Birthdays. He also appeared in a short-form series titled The New Adventures of Mr. Mailman.
 Rico was Chica's cousin who made occasional appearances.
 Chica's Nana made occasional appearances, usually alongside Rico.

Guest stars 
The following is a list of television programs from which guest stars originated, and the characters from those programs which appeared on Sunny Side Up:

 Barney & Friends: Barney, Riff
 Sesame Street and The Furchester Hotel: Big Bird, Oscar the Grouch, Grover, Prairie Dawn, Elmo, Abby Cadabby, Cookie Monster
 The Wiggles: Greg Page, Murray Cook, Anthony Field, Jeff Fatt, Captain Feathersword (Paul Paddick), Emma Watkins, Lachlan Gillespie, Simon Pryce, Sam Moran
 LazyTown: Sportacus, Stephanie
 Noodle and Doodle: Noodle McNoodle
 Jim Henson's Pajanimals: Squacky, Sweetpea Sue
 Sprout Sharing Show: Patty, Ricky, Curtis E. Owl, Stage Mice
 The Good Night Show: Nina, Star
 The Let's Go Show: Miles
 Bounce: Elizabeth
 Laurie Berkner
 Dan Zanes
 The Dream Jam Band
 Justin Roberts
 Elizabeth Mitchell
 Lisa Loeb
 The Okee Dokee Brothers
 The Pop-Ups
 Jose Garces
 Richard Blais
 Mario Lopez
 Michael Weiss
 Annie McLaughlin
 Judy Kahn
 Christa Mereen
 Michael Krajewski
 Norm Schultz
 Bill Konstant
 Stevie Boulden
 American Authors
 Michelle Obama
 Keke Palmer
 Simone Biles
 Jenny Slate
 Postmodern Jukebox
 Patrick Warburton
 Mo'ne Davis
 Laurie Hernandez
 Brandy
 Faith Evans
 B. J. Novak
 Padma Lakshmi
 Boyz II Men
 Willie Garson
 John Green
 Bryce Dallas Howard
 John O'Hurley
 Sanya Richards Ross
 Alyssa Milano
 The Chica Show: Mr. C, Mrs. C (the latter was previously a recurring character)
 Sprout Control Room: Meeka (also known as Banjo in The Let's Go Show), M'Goats

Programming
 Roary the Racing Car (2008-2012)
 Fifi and the Flowertots (2008-2014)
 Barney & Friends (2007-2015)
 Thomas & Friends (2007-2015)
 Dive, Olly, Dive! (2008-2014)
 Fireman Sam (2007-2014)
 Play with Me Sesame (2007-2015)
 What's Your News? (2010-2014)
 Picme (2008-2011)
 Tree Fu Tom (2013-2016)
 Maya the Bee (2015-2017)
 Noodle and Doodle
 The Furchester Hotel (2016-2017)
 Sarah & Duck (2013-2017)
 Floogals (2016-2017)
 Super Wings (2015-2017)
 Ruff-Ruff, Tweet and Dave (2015-2017)
 Chloe's Closet (2010-2017)
 The Chica Show (2012-2015)
 Super Why! (2011-2015)
 Dragon Tales (2007-2010)
 Bob the Builder (2007-2015)
 The Berenstain Bears (2007-2017)
 Pingu (2007-2010)
 Lily's Driftwood Bay (2014-2017)
  Boj'' (2015-2017)

References

Television programming blocks in the United States
American television shows featuring puppetry
Universal Kids original programming